Colvin Creek is a stream in Ripley County in the U.S. state of Missouri. It is a tributary of the Current River.

Colvin Creek has the name of the local Colvin family.

See also
List of rivers of Missouri

References

Rivers of Ripley County, Missouri
Rivers of Missouri